Filip Niclas Berg (born 2 October 1986) is a Swedish actor who became known to international audiences for his roles Sebbe in the movies The Ketchup Effect and A Man Called Ove, which was nominated for best foreign-language film at the Academy Awards. He also had a leading role in both series of the TV drama, Black Lake.

Berg was born in Danderyd, Stockholm County. As a student he attended the Adolf Fredrik's Music School in Stockholm.

His other roles include a supporting role in the 2003 movie, Ondskan, also starring Andreas Wilson and Gustaf Skarsgård. He played the main character in the Swedish zombie TV series The Last Reality Show.

Selected filmography

Selected television
Black Lake, 2016, "Svartsjön"

References

External links

Swedish male actors
1986 births
Living people